Desrochers is a surname. Notable people with the surname include:

 Étienne-Jehandier Desrochers (1668–1741), French engraver
 François Desrochers, Canadian politician
 Odina Desrochers, Canadian politician
 Patrick DesRochers, Canadian ice hockey goaltender
 Pierre Desrochers, city councillor in Montreal, Quebec, Canada.

See also
Desrochers, Edmonton, a neighbourhood in Edmonton, Alberta, Canada